Kate Vitasek (born September 19, 1968) is an American author and educator. She is a faculty member for Graduate and Executive Education at the University of Tennessee Haslam College of Business Her research focuses on the Vested outsourcing business model, sourcing business model theory, the relational contract, and collaborative win-win business relationships.

Career 
Before joining University of Tennessee, she worked for P&G, Microsoft, Accenture, Stream International, and Modus Media Modus Media International.

At University of Tennessee, Vitasek researches business models. In 2010, Vitasek and two researchers codified their findings on the Vested business model into a methodology to enable organizations to create highly collaborative relationships. Vitasek's work on the Vested business model led to what is known to as Sourcing Business Model theory. Many of Vitasek's books are about the Vested outsourcing collaborative win-win relationships. Vitasek has also done research for the U.S. Air Force on issues relating to contracting logistics and transportation.

Vitasek's recent research has focused on relational contracting. In 2021 she published (with David Frydlinger, Jim Bergman, and Tim Cummins) Contracting in the New Economy: Using Relational Contracts to Boost Trust and Collaboration in Strategic Business Relationships which argues for adopting formal relational contracts as the standard for contracting activity. The Nobel laureate Oliver Hart's Foreword in the book notes, “…for a long time I have felt that the traditional approach to contracts, where lawyers try to think of all the possible things that can go wrong in a relationship and include contractual provisions to deal with them, is broken.” Hart added that it “never worked that well, and in an increasingly complex and uncertain world it works even worse.”

In 2019, Vitasek Frydlinger and Hart collaborated on a Harvard Business Review article, "A New Approach to Contracts: How to Build Better long-term strategic partnerships". The authors assert that "a formal relational contract lays a foundation of trust, specifies mutual goals, and establishes governance structures to keep the parties’ expectations and interests aligned over time."

Reviews of works 
Vested Outsourcing (2010) describes how to outsource business processes or services. The book identifies potential issues in outsourcing and how companies can best work together for a good outsourcing relationship. Hollye Moss, professor at the Western Carolina University, wrote that the book "takes a new approach to the relationship, creating a win-win scenario. It is well-written, easy to read, and thought-provoking." Booklist wrote that Vested: How P&G, McDonald's and Microsoft are Redefining Winning in Business Relationships (2012) was a "lively presentation" by the authors and that it "should appeal to businesspeople willing to take a chance on trust and transparency to produce transformative results."

Awards and recognition 
Vitasek was recognized by The Journal of Commerce as a "Woman on the Move in Trade and Transportation" and as a "Rainmaker" by DC Velocity for her contributions to building the supply chain profession. For her work on Vested, she was named one of Globalization Today's "Powerhouse 25" outsourcing industry leaders.  Other accolades include recognition by Logistics Quarterly and Supply Chain Digest as a "Woman in Supply Chain," honored as a "Woman of International Influence" by Global Executive Women, and being named on the Global Sourcing Association's inaugural "A-List".

Selected works

Books

References

External links
 

1968 births
20th-century American women writers
21st-century American women writers
20th-century American businesswomen
20th-century American businesspeople
21st-century American businesswomen
21st-century American businesspeople
Accenture people
American women non-fiction writers
American women academics
American management consultants
Living people
Microsoft employees
Procter & Gamble people
University of Tennessee faculty
20th-century American non-fiction writers
21st-century American non-fiction writers